Petelo may refer to:

Zolani Petelo (born 1975), South African boxer
Petelo Kahofuna, Wallis and Futuna royalty
Petelo Vikena (c. 1943), Wallis and Futuna royalty